Johnnie Woodrow Parsons (July 4, 1918 –  September 8, 1984) was an American race car driver from Los Angeles, California who won the Indianapolis 500 in 1950.

During his racing career, he drove for several seasons, including his AAA championship and Indianapolis 500 win, for Ed Walsh's team. Walsh was an owner of Kurtis Kraft, the leading constructor of AAA championship cars. Parsons was a charger, needing cars to race against, frequently moving from last on the grid to a win in spectacular displays of dirt track driving ability. 

Johnnie Parsons had the dubious distinction of being the only Indianapolis 500 winner to have his name misspelled on the Borg-Warner Trophy. The silversmith carved "Johnny" instead of "Johnnie." He had a son named Johnny who competed at Indy a dozen times. In 1991, during a trophy restoration project, it was proposed to correct the spelling, albeit posthumously. However, it was decided to keep the error intact, as part of the trophy's lore.

Racing career
Parsons first raced in open wheel cars on the West Coast of the United States in a midget car. He won the 1942 season championship in the United Midget Association. He won 18 feature events in the abbreviated season. Parsons began racing in the AAA after World War II. He captured the third feature in the 1948 Night Before the 500 midget race at the 16th Street Speedway. Parsons finished second in his first Indy 500 in 1949. He won the season championship that season. He also won the 1950 Indianapolis 500. He won the 1955 Turkey Night Grand Prix midget car race.

After he retired, he became the Chief Steward for the USAC Midget division on the West Coast in the 1970s.

Awards
He was inducted in the Motorsports Hall of Fame of America in 2004.
He was inducted in the National Midget Auto Racing Hall of Fame in 1984. Parsons died before receiving notification that he was selected to the hall of fame.

Complete AAA/USAC Championship Car results

Indianapolis 500 results

Parsons initially failed to qualify for the 1957 Indianapolis 500. However, Dick Rathmann (who had qualified) was mugged the day before the race and therefore deemed unable to drive. Parsons was selected as replacement driver for the car and allowed to start from the position Dick Rathmann had qualified the car at (in later years such a driver change would see the car in question moved to the rear of the field).

World Championship career summary
The Indianapolis 500 was part of the FIA World Championship from 1950 through 1960. Drivers competing at Indy during those years were credited with World Championship points and participation. Johnnie Parsons participated in 9 World Championship races. He won one race, set one fastest leading lap, and finished on the podium once. He accumulated a total of 12 championship points.

Parsons is one of only three drivers to win on his world championship début. The other two are Nino Farina, who won the first world championship racethe 1950 British Grand Prix, 17 days earlierand Giancarlo Baghetti, who won the 1961 French Grand Prix.

Complete FIA World Drivers Championship results
(key) (Races in italics indicate fastest lap)

References

1918 births
1984 deaths
Champ Car champions
Indianapolis 500 drivers
Indianapolis 500 winners
American racing drivers
Racing drivers from Los Angeles
AAA Championship Car drivers
Formula One race winners